Kinshasa Airways was a cargo airline based in Sharjah, United Arab Emirates. It was established in 2002 by Willy Mubela Kumwimba and operated cargo services from the Democratic Republic of the Congo and the Middle East. As of June 2010, Kinshasa Airways was on the List of air carriers banned in the EU, it ended operations the same year.

Fleet 
At August 2010 the Kinshasa Airways fleet included:
1 Boeing 707-320B
1 Boeing 727-200
1 Boeing 747SP (stored in Sharjah)
2 Douglas DC-8-55JT

Previously operated
As of January 2005 the airline operated:
1 Boeing 707-320C
1 Tupolev Tu-154B-2
2 A.119 Koala

See also		
 Transport in the Democratic Republic of the Congo

References

Defunct airlines of the United Arab Emirates
Defunct airlines of the Democratic Republic of the Congo
Airlines established in 2002
Airlines disestablished in 2010
2002 establishments in the Democratic Republic of the Congo
Emirati companies established in 2002